Emily Grace Whitehurst (born July 23, 1979), also known as Agent M, is an American singer, songwriter, composer, musician, and record producer. In 1998, she began her music career by fronting the punk rock band Tsunami Bomb. After Tsunami Bomb disbanded in 2005, she co-founded and fronted the Action Design; a rock group. Since 2012, Whitehurst has been working on her synth-driven, indie pop project, Survival Guide.

Career
Whitehurst joined Tsunami Bomb in 1998 after the departure of original vocalist Kristin McRory. Whitehurst adopted the stage name Agent M at this time, and used it throughout her stay in the band. In 2000, Tsunami Bomb signed to Tomato Head Records and released their debut EP The Invasion from Within!. Their first full-length CD, The Ultimate Escape, followed in 2002. In 2004, the band released a final recording, The Definitive Act, on Kung Fu Records. Tsunami Bomb split up the following year, the members parting on good terms with each other.

Whitehurst and former Tsunami Bomb bassist Matt McKenzie later formed  The Action Design with drummer Jake Krohn, and guitarist Jaycen McKissick from Pipedown. Whitehurst said that The Action Design would differ from Tsunami Bomb by embracing a more experimental approach.

Whitehurst has made guest appearances on several other bands' recordings, including the song "My Town and Twins" on Guttermouth's record Gusto. She also performed guest vocal on her brother Logan's album, Goodbye, My 4-Track. Agent M performed a song with The Bouncing Souls when Tsunami Bomb supported them on tour. She performs on MxPx album, On the Cover II, for "Heaven is a Place On Earth".

Emily Whitehurst and Jaycen McKissick (Tsunami Bomb / The Action Design) formed a new project dubbed Survival Guide. The band's debut 7-inch "Hot Lather Machine" was released on June 30, 2011 via Side With Us Records.

Family
Whitehurst is from Los Banos, California. She is the sister of fellow musicians, the late Logan Whitehurst and Eliott Whitehurst of the northern California band Trebuchet.

References

External links
The Action Design Official Site
The Action Design Fansite

1979 births
Living people
American rock singers
Singers from California
Women punk rock singers
Place of birth missing (living people)
21st-century American singers
21st-century American women singers